Dr. Panjabrao Deshmukh Airport Amravati, is located in Belora, 15 kilometres south of Amravati, Maharashtra, India.

History
The airstrip, constructed by the Public Works Department in 1992, was taken over by the Maharashtra Industrial Development Corporation (MIDC) in August 1997 and later transferred to the Maharashtra Airport Development Company (MADC). In February 2014, the Maharashtra government decided to lease the airport to the Airports Authority of India (AAI) for 60 years for a monthly rent of Rs 100,000. The AAI will develop the airport over three years. The runway will be extended to 2,500 metres suitable for landing Airbus A-320 aircraft.

Nagpur Flying Club
The Nagpur Flying Club has applied to Director General of Civil Aviation (DGCA) for permission to shift its flying operations to Amravati Airport.

See also
 
 Akola Airport

References

External links
 Amravati Airport at MADC web site

Airports in Maharashtra
Amravati
Vidarbha
Transport in Amravati
Airports established in 1992
1992 establishments in Maharashtra
20th-century architecture in India